Richard Coxon (born 14 January 1945) is an Australian sailor. He competed in the Star event at the 1984 Summer Olympics.

References

External links
 

1945 births
Living people
Australian male sailors (sport)
Olympic sailors of Australia
Sailors at the 1984 Summer Olympics – Star
Place of birth missing (living people)